Symmoca salinata is a moth of the family Autostichidae. It is found in Turkey.

References

Moths described in 1986
Symmoca
Insects of Turkey